Actia interrupta is a species of tachinid flies in the genus Actia of the family Tachinidae. Actia interrupta is an important parasitoid of the obliquebanded leafroller.

Distribution
Alaska, British Columbia to Newfoundland, California to Virginia and Tennessee, not recorded from most of central United States with the exception of Colorado.

References

Diptera of North America
interrupta
Insects described in 1933